A range extender is a fuel-based auxiliary power unit (APU) that extends the range of a battery electric vehicle by driving an electric generator that charges the vehicle's battery. This arrangement is known as a series hybrid drivetrain. The most commonly used range extenders are internal combustion engines, but fuel-cells or other engine types can be used.

Range extender vehicles are also referred to as extended-range electric vehicles (EREV), range-extended electric vehicles (REEV), and range-extended battery-electric vehicle (BEVx) by the California Air Resources Board (CARB).

Many range extender vehicles, including the Chevrolet Volt and the BMW i3, are able to charge their batteries from the grid as well as from the range extender, and therefore are a type of plug-in hybrid electric vehicle (PHEV).

Motivation 
The key function of the range extender is to increase the vehicle's range. Range autonomy is one of the main barriers for the commercial success of electric vehicles, and extending the vehicle's range when the battery is depleted helps alleviate range anxiety.

A range extending vehicle design can also reduce the consumption of the range extending fuel (such as gasoline) by using the primary fuel (such as battery power), while still maintaining the driving range of a single fuel vehicle powered by a range extending fuel such as gasoline. The range extending fuel is generally considered to be less environmentally and economically friendly to use than the primary fuel source, so the vehicle control system gives preference to using the primary fuel if it's available. However, due to range limitations with the primary fuel source, the range extending fuel allows the vehicle to get many of the cost and environmental benefits of the primary fuel, while maintaining the full driving range of the range extending fuel source. That said, the benefits (cost, carbon emissions) derived from using a vehicle with a range extender ultimately depend on how the vehicle is driven, and in particular how often the range extender is used.

As an example, cars such as the Chevrolet Volt and the BMW i3 with optional range extender are equipped with sufficiently large batteries to drive , which is enough for many trips but not sufficient to drive long distances. As such, the driver may use battery power for commuting and daily driving, but still be able to drive from New York to Boston (about ) by using the auxiliary gasoline internal combustion engine, without stopping frequently to charge the battery (which can take hours). The vehicle owner therefore accrues the benefits of using cheaper and less carbon-intensive electric power for most driving, while maintaining the ability to embark on longer trips with the same vehicle.

When a range extender uses conventional fuels they can re-fuel at regular fuel stations, which provides them with a similar driving range to conventional automobiles.

As an REEV is only propelled by the electric motor it can do away with the weight and cost associated with the gearbox transmission system typically used in internal combustion engine cars. Further, as the range extender does not need to increase or decrease output in line with the power needs of the vehicle (this task is handled by the electric motor) the range extender can be sized to satisfy the vehicle's average power requirement rather than its peak power requirement (such as when accelerating). The range extender can also operate much closer to its most efficient rotational speed. These design features allow an REEV to convert fossil fuel energy to electric power and vehicle motion relatively efficiently.

Generations
The first generation range extenders are off the shelf internal combustion engines. 
The second generation consists of piston engines with new designs from scratch for fairly constant load in series hybrids. They include the wankel engines, rotary combustion engines and free piston engines. 
The third generation are micro turbines and fuel cells that work at constant load.

CARB regulation
According to 2012 Amendments to the Zero Emission Vehicle Regulations adopted in March 2012 by the California Air Resources Board (CARB), a range-extended battery-electric vehicle, designated as BEVx, should comply, among others, with the following criteria:
 The vehicle must have a rated all-electric range of at least . This is higher than the  required of a zero-emission vehicle;
 The auxiliary power unit (APU) must provide range less than or equal to battery range;
 The APU must not be capable of switching on until the battery charge has been depleted;
 The vehicle must meet super ultra low emission vehicle (SULEV) requirements; and
 The APU and all associated fuel systems must comply with zero evaporative emissions requirements.

Applications
Range extenders are commonly used in marine (autonomous underwater vehicle), aircraft and Generator/Utility, automotive and hybrid electric vehicle applications.

Automotive

Chevrolet Volt

General Motors describes the Chevrolet Volt as an electric vehicle equipped with a 16 kWh battery plus a "range extending" gasoline powered internal combustion engine (ICE) as a genset and therefore dubbed the Volt an "Extended Range Electric Vehicle" or E-REV.  In a January 2011 interview, the Chevy Volt's Global Chief Engineer, Pamela Fletcher, referred to the Volt as "an electric car with extended range." The Volt operates as a purely electric car for the first  in charge-depleting mode. When the battery capacity drops below a pre-established threshold from full charge, the vehicle enters charge-sustaining mode, and the Volt's control system will select the most optimally efficient drive mode to improve performance and boost high-speed efficiency.

GM also reported that Volt owners driving is more than 63% in all-electric mode. A similar report, issued by GM in August 2016, reported that Volt owners have accumulated almost  driven in EV mode, representing 60% of their total distance traveled.

BMW i3

The BMW i3 all-electric car with at least 22 kWh battery capacity offers an optional gasoline-powered range extender APU. The range extender is the same 647 cc two-cylinder gasoline engine used in the BMW C650 GT scooter with a  fuel tank. The US model originally had its tank electronically limited to a smaller 7 L capacity. The range extender engages when the battery level drops to 6%.

According to BMW, at the beginning of the i3 release, the use of range-extender was much more than the carmaker expected, more than 60%. Over time it has decreased significantly, with some people almost never using it, and by 2016 it is being regularly used in fewer than 5% of i3s.

The range-extender option of the BMW i3 was designed to meet the CARB regulation for an auxiliary power unit (APU) called REx. According to rules CARB adopted in March 2012, the 2014 BMW i3 with a REx unit fitted will be the first car to qualify as a range-extended battery-electric vehicle or "BEVx." CARB describes this type of electric vehicle as "a relatively high-electric range battery-electric vehicle (BEV) to which an APU is added." The APU, which maintains battery charge at about 6% after the pack has been depleted in normal use, is strictly limited in the additional range it can provide.

Other examples 

Other range-extended electric vehicles include the discontinued Cadillac ELR and the discontinued Fisker Karma. In June 2016, Nissan announced it will introduce a compact range extender car in Japan before March 2017. The series plug-in hybrid will use a new hybrid system, dubbed e-Power, which debuted with the Nissan Gripz concept crossover showcased at the 2015 Frankfurt Auto Show. The technology, without the plug-in ability, had been deployed to the Nissan Note e-Power and Nissan Kicks e-Power.

The LEVC TX London taxi was launched in 2017 and features a 33 kWh battery that is charged by a 1.5-litre gasoline engine.

The Lixiang One is a large SUV which combines a 41-kWh battery with a small 1.2-litre gasoline engine.

This approach has also been used for heavy vehicles, such as Wrightbus's Gemini 2 and New Routemaster buses.

Ford has patents for a bed mounted gasoline-powered generator for their fully electric pickups. Rivian has patents for bed mounted additional batteries for increased range. Rivian electric trucks can charge each other for extended range.

Unmanned aerial vehicles 
The 2010 Wolverine 3 program included an ICE range extender for its unmanned aerial vehicle.

Powertrain

A range-extended electric vehicle uses a series hybrid drivetrain.

See also
 Genset trailer
 Hybrid vehicle drivetrain
 Microturbines
 List of hybrid and plug-in hybrid vehicles

References

Vehicle technology
Electric vehicles
Plug-in hybrid vehicles